Heswall is a town in Wirral, Merseyside, England.  It contains nine buildings that are recorded in the National Heritage List for England as designated listed buildings.   Of these, one is listed at Grade II*, the middle of the three grades, and the others are at Grade II, the lowest grade.  The list includes those in the adjacent villages of Barnston, Thingwall and Pensby.  The listed buildings consist of two churches, houses, a bank, a sundial, and a war memorial.

Key

Buildings

References

Citations

Sources

Listed buildings in Merseyside
Lists of listed buildings in Merseyside